The Greenwich Trio is a classical piano trio formed in 2006. Its members are Lana Trotovšek (violin), Heather Tuach (cello), and Yoko Misumi (piano).

The Greenwich Trio, described by cellist Bernard Greenhouse as the "New Beaux Arts Trio", was originally formed by pianist Yoko Misumi, Beethoven Society of Europe top prize-winner; Lana Trotovsek,  a talent unveiled by Ruggiero Ricci’s at Salzburg's Mozarteum; and cellist Stjepan Hauser, last student of Mstislav Rostropovich and winner of 21 first prizes all over the world.

The trio won series of first prizes in the international chamber music competitions in UK, Belgium and Italy.

The Greenwich Trio received regular coaching from Bernard Greenhouse and Stephen Kovacevich, and has also received coaching from Beaux Arts Trio, Ivry Gitlis, Alban Berg Quartet, Wihan Quartet, The Schubert Ensemble, Israel Piano Trio, and Rivka Golani. During their time together, they performed in some of the most prestigious European international music festivals and released numerous recordings.

References

External links 

The Greenwich Trio Win First Prize at "Carlo Mosso" 2008 in Italy (Trinity College of Music)
Greenwich Trio speelt Mozart en Ravel in Iskra Monumentconcert (Weekblad De Duinstreek) 
Stjepan Hauser performed for Prince Charles at Buckingham Palace on April 23 (Croatia.org)

Musical groups established in 2006
Piano trios